Abali (also Romanized as Āb‘alī) is a village in Javid-e Mahuri Rural District, in the Central District of Mamasani County, Fars Province, Iran. At the 2006 census, its population was 29, in 7 families.

References 

Populated places in Mamasani County